An open-mid vowel (also mid-open vowel, low-mid vowel, mid-low vowel or half-open vowel) is any in a class of vowel sound used in some spoken languages. The defining characteristic of an open-mid vowel is that the tongue is positioned one third of the way from an open vowel to a close vowel.

Partial list
The open-mid vowels that have dedicated symbols in the International Phonetic Alphabet are:

 open-mid front unrounded vowel 
 open-mid front rounded vowel 
 open-mid central unrounded vowel  (older publications may use )
 open-mid central rounded vowel  (older publications may use )
 open-mid back unrounded vowel 
 open-mid back rounded vowel 

Other open-mid vowels can be indicated with diacritics of relative articulation applied to letters for neighboring vowels.

Vowels by height